San Fernando is a municipality in the Honduran department of Ocotepeque.

Demographics
At the time of the 2013 Honduras census, San Fernando municipality had a population of 6,948. Of these, 99.38% were Mestizo, 0.30% Indigenous, 0.19% Black or Afro-Honduran and 0.13% White.

References

Municipalities of the Ocotepeque Department